Undercover Duet is a 2015 action comedy film directed by Mark Wu. A Hong Kong-China co-production, the film was released in Hong Kong on August 27 and in China on October 23, 2015.

Cast
Ronald Cheng
Mark Wu
Ava Yu
Yang Jianping
Wang Chuanjun
Louis Cheung
Peter So
Zhang Chi
Terry Zou
Tony Ho
Tin Kai-man
Kaki Leung
Lau Kong
Cheng Tse-sing
Derek Wong
Benjamin Yeung
Angelina Zhang
Wen Chao

Reception
In Hong Kong, the film has grossed HK$7.01 million (US$905,000). The film has earned  at the Chinese box office.

References

External links

2015 action comedy films
2010s Cantonese-language films
Chinese action comedy films
Hong Kong action comedy films
2010s Mandarin-language films
2010s Hong Kong films